Qoppoz (also Romanized as Qobboz and Qoppūz; also known as Qopor) is a village in Qushkhaneh-ye Bala Rural District, Qushkhaneh District, Shirvan County, North Khorasan Province, Iran. At the 2006 census, its population was 351, in 70 families.

References 

Populated places in Shirvan County